Robert Brownlee Observatory  (RBO) is an astronomical observatory owned and operated by the Mountain Skies Astronomical Society (MSAS).  It is located in Lake Arrowhead, California, USA.

The observatory was named for Robert Gregg Brownlee, a biochemist.

See also
 List of observatories

References

External links
Robert Brownlee Observatory Clear Sky Clock Forecast of observing conditions.

Astronomical observatories in California
Buildings and structures in San Bernardino County, California